VII is the seventh album by old school hip hop/hardcore rapper Just-Ice, it was released in 1998.

Track listing
Free Flow
Cool and Wicked
Pressure Dem
Way Back (We're Going)
Jedi
If Ya Kill Sound
Cold Getting Dumb (’98 Remix)
C'mon and Try and Get It
Lip Service
Have You Ever?

References

1998 albums
Just-Ice albums